Wesley R. Belter (born April 18, 1945) is an American politician who served as a member of the North Dakota House of Representatives, representing the 22nd district. A Republican, he was first elected in 1984. An alumnus of North Dakota State University, he also worked as a farmer. He has also served in the United States Air Force and Air National Guard.

References

1945 births
Living people
People from Cass County, North Dakota
Speakers of the North Dakota House of Representatives
Republican Party members of the North Dakota House of Representatives
21st-century American politicians